Just Colour is a 1968 album by the American garage rock band The Lollipop Shoppe. Just Colour is the only album released by the group. "You Must Be a Witch" was included in the  Nuggets compilation reissue in 1998.

Track listing
All tracks written by Fred Cole and Bob Atkins unless otherwise noted.
"You Must Be a Witch" (Cole) – 2:40
"Underground Railroad" (Cole, Ron Buzzel) – 7:45
"Baby Don't Go" – 2:50
"Who'll Read the Will" – 2:30
"It's Only a Reflection" (Ed Bowen) – 3:00
"Don't Look Back" (Cole) – 2:35
"Don't Close the Door on Me" (Cole, Buzzel) – 4:20
"It Ain't How Long" (Cole, Bowen) – 2:36
"It's Makin' It" (Cole, Bowen) – 2:25
"I'm Gonna Be There" – 2:40
"You Don't Give Me No More" – 2:17
"Sin" (Cole) – 2:20

1998 CD bonus tracks
 "Someone I Know" (Cole, Buzzel) – 4:08
 "Through My Window" (Cole, Buzzel) – 2:38
 "Mr. Madison Avenue Stop" – 2:34
 "Who's It Gonna Be" (Cole) – 2:28

Personnel
 Fred Cole (Lead Vocals)
 Bob Atkins (Bass Guitar)
 Ed Bowen (Lead Guitar, Backing Vocals)
 Ron Buzzel (Rhythm Guitar, Backing Vocals)
 Tim Rockson (Drums)
 John "The Greek" (Organ, Piano)
 Carl Fortina (Accordion)
 Danielle Mauroy (Producer)

References

1968 debut albums
The Lollipop Shoppe albums
Uni Records albums
Rev-Ola Records albums
Albums recorded at Gold Star Studios